The following is a list of awards and nominations received by Bates Motel, the American drama-thriller television series that debuted on A&E on March 18, 2013. The series stars Vera Farmiga and Freddie Highmore in lead roles.

Awards by association

Primetime Emmy Awards

Television Critics Association Awards

Critics' Choice Television Awards

Casting Society of America

Satellite Awards

Saturn Awards

People's Choice Awards

Imagen Awards

Make-Up Artists and Hair Stylists Guild

Dorian Awards

Online Film & Television Association Awards

Women's Image Network Awards

Gracie Awards

Golden Reel Awards

IGN Awards

Poppy Awards

TV Guide Awards

Fangoria Chainsaw Awards

ACTRA Awards

References

External links
 

Awards
Bates